In mathematics, the curvature of a measure defined on the Euclidean plane R2 is a quantification of how much the measure's "distribution of mass" is "curved". It is related to notions of curvature in geometry. In the form presented below, the concept was introduced in 1995 by the mathematician Mark S. Melnikov; accordingly, it may be referred to as the Melnikov curvature or Menger-Melnikov curvature. Melnikov and Verdera (1995) established a powerful connection between the curvature of measures and the Cauchy kernel.

Definition

Let μ be a Borel measure on the Euclidean plane R2. Given three (distinct) points x, y and z in R2, let R(x, y, z) be the radius of the Euclidean circle that joins all three of them, or +∞ if they are collinear. The Menger curvature c(x, y, z) is defined to be

with the natural convention that c(x, y, z) = 0 if x, y and z are collinear. It is also conventional to extend this definition by setting c(x, y, z) = 0 if any of the points x, y and z coincide. The Menger-Melnikov curvature c2(μ) of μ is defined to be

More generally, for α ≥ 0, define c2α(μ) by

One may also refer to the curvature of μ at a given point x:

in which case

Examples

 The trivial measure has zero curvature.
 A Dirac measure δa supported at any point a has zero curvature.
 If μ is any measure whose support is contained within a Euclidean line L, then μ has zero curvature. For example, one-dimensional Lebesgue measure on any line (or line segment) has zero curvature.
 The Lebesgue measure defined on all of R2 has infinite curvature.
 If μ is the uniform one-dimensional Hausdorff measure on a circle Cr or radius r, then μ has curvature 1/r.

Relationship to the Cauchy kernel

In this section, R2 is thought of as the complex plane C. Melnikov and Verdera (1995) showed the precise relation of the boundedness of the Cauchy kernel to the curvature of measures. They proved that if there is some constant C0 such that

for all x in C and all r > 0, then there is another constant C, depending only on C0, such that

for all ε > 0. Here cε denotes a truncated version of the Menger-Melnikov curvature in which the integral is taken only over those points x, y and z such that

Similarly,  denotes a truncated Cauchy integral operator: for a measure μ on C and a point z in C, define

where the integral is taken over those points ξ in C with

References

 
 
 

Curvature (mathematics)
Measure theory